Kihoku Dam  is a gravity dam located in Kagoshima Prefecture in Japan. The dam is used for irrigation.  The dam impounds about 72  ha of land when full and can store 8200 thousand cubic meters of water. The construction of the dam was started on 1979 and completed in 2005.

See also
List of dams in Japan

References

Dams in Kagoshima Prefecture